A general hospital is a type of medical facility which is set up to deal with many kinds of disease and injury.

General hospital may also refer to:

Associated with medical institutions
 Rural general hospital, a specific type of medical facility in Scotland that serves a remote and rural area
 General hospital, a type of hospital in Thailand, primarily located in province capitals or major districts
 General Hospital, Ernakulam, a state-owned hospital in Kochi, India
 Metro Hospital General, a metro station in Mexico City near the General Hospital of Mexico

Entertainment
 General Hospital, an American soap opera broadcast since 1963
 "General Hospital" (Blackadder), a 1989 episode of the UK television series Blackadder
 General Hospital (British TV series), a British soap opera broadcast from 1972 to 1979

See also
 Hospital (disambiguation)